Magomed Magomedov (16 January 1957 - 15 January 2013) was a senior judge at the Supreme Court of Dagestan.

Early life
Magomedov was born in Kubachi, Dagestan, in 1957.

Career
Magomedov was a judge at the Supreme Court of Dagestan and dealt with high-profile cases that were mostly related to terrorists and Islamic insurgents. He was one of nine judges in the presidium of the court.

Death and funeral
On 15 January 2013, around 9 p.m. in Makhachkala, Magomedov was shot by an unknown person while he was heading to his home. He died on the spot. A funeral service was carried out for him in his native village, Kubachi, on 16 January 2013.

References

1957 births
2013 deaths
Assassinated Dagestanian people
Assassinated Russian people
Russian judges
Russian people of Dagestani descent